Domenico Agostini (31 May 1825 — 31 December 1891) was an Italian Roman Catholic Cardinal and Patriarch of Venice.

Born near Treviso, he studied in the local seminary, then in the University of Padua. He took a doctorate of philosophy and law, but he left the clerical state to join the citizen militia during the war with Austria in the period 1848–1850. He received the minor orders in 1850, after rejoining the clerical state.

He was ordained priest on 26 January 1851 in Venice and incardinated in the diocese of Treviso. Elected bishop of Chioggia on 27 October 1871. Then he was promoted to the patriarchal see of Venice on 22 June 1877.

Agostini was created cardinal priest in the consistory of 27 March 1882 by Pope Leo XIII with the title of Sant'Eusebio. Opted for title of Santa Maria della Pace on 7 June 1886.

Cardinal Agostini died on New Year's Eve, 1891.

External links
The Cardinals of the Holy Roman Church - Biographical Dictionary
Catholic Hierarchy data for this cardinal

1825 births
1891 deaths
People from Treviso
19th-century Italian Roman Catholic bishops
Cardinals created by Pope Leo XIII
19th-century Italian cardinals